New England Pilgrims may refer to:
New England College Pilgrims, the athletic program for New England College in Henniker, New Hampshire
New England Pilgrims (softball), a defunct professional softball team that was based in New Haven, Connecticut

See also
Pilgrims (Plymouth Colony), the English settlers who came to North America on the Mayflower and established the Plymouth Colony in what is today Plymouth, Massachusetts